Macedonia is an Unincorporated community in northeast Williamson County, Texas. In 1988 a cemetery was the sole place in the former settlement.

Education
The school in Macedonia had 99 students in 1900. The number of students gradually declined, and in 1949 the school was consolidated into the Palacky school.

References

External links
 

Unincorporated communities in Williamson County, Texas
Unincorporated communities in Texas